Mrs. Erricker's Reputation is a 1920 British silent drama film directed by Cecil M. Hepworth and starring Alma Taylor, Gerald Ames and James Carew.

Cast
 Alma Taylor as Georgiana Erricker  
 Gerald Ames as Vincent Dampier 
 James Carew as Sir Richard Erricker 
 Eileen Dennes as Lady Lettice Erricker 
 Gwynne Herbert as Lady Erricker

References

Bibliography
 Palmer, Scott. British Film Actors' Credits, 1895-1987. McFarland, 1988.

External links

1920 films
1920 drama films
British drama films
British silent feature films
Films directed by Cecil Hepworth
Films set in England
Films based on British novels
Hepworth Pictures films
British black-and-white films
1920s English-language films
1920s British films
Silent drama films